98.5 Gold FM Radyo Kaibigan (DXLG 98.5 MHz) is an FM station owned by Kalayaan Broadcasting System and operated by Kaibigan Brotherhood Association of Bukidnon. Its studios and transmitter are located at Valencia, Bukidnon.

References

External links
Gold FM FB Page

Radio stations in Bukidnon